cc65 is a cross development package for 6502 and 65C02 targets, including a macro assembler, a C cross compiler, linker, librarian and several other tools.

Overview
cc65 is based on a native C compiler that was originally adapted for the Atari 8-bit computers by John R. Dunning in 1989, which originated as a Small C descendant. It has several extensions, and some of the limits of the original Small C compiler are gone.

The toolkit has largely been expanded by Ullrich von Bassewitz and other contributors. The actual cc65 compiler, a complete set of binary tools (assembler, linker, etc.) and runtime library are under a license identical to zlib's.

The compiler itself comes close to ANSI C compatibility, while C library features depend on the target platform's hardware. stdio is supported on many platforms, as is Borland-style  screen handling. GEOS is also supported on the Commodore 64 and even the Apple II. The library supports many of the Commodore platforms (C64, C128, C16/116/Plus/4, P500 and 600/700 family), Apple II family, Atari 8-bit family, Oric Atmos, Nintendo Entertainment System, Watara Supervision game console, Synertek Systems SYM-1 and Ohio Scientific Challenger 1P.

Officially supported host systems include Linux, Microsoft Windows, MS-DOS and OS/2, but the source code itself has been reported to work almost unmodified on many platforms beside these.

The ca65 macro assembler supports 6502, 65C02, and 65C816 processors, and can be used standalone without the C compiler.

Supported API

static
conio (text-based console I/O non-scrolling)
dio (block-oriented disk I/O bypassing the file system)

dynamic
em (expanded memory, used for all kinds of memory beyond the 6502's 64K barrier, similar EMS)
joystick (relative input devices)
mouse (absolute input devices)
serial (communication)
tgi (2D graphics primitives inspired by BGI)

Note: For static libraries, "Yes" means the feature is available. For dynamic libraries, the columns list the number of available drivers.

References

External links
 Official website (archive) (no longer maintained)
 Modern github fork of cc65
 Contiki desktop, written with cc65
 Atari TGI 2009-11-02 release announcement on cc65 mailing list
 Android host

C (programming language) compilers
Cross-compilers
Free compilers and interpreters
Assemblers
Atari 8-bit family
Commodore 64
Apple II family